Adit Nunatak is an exposed area of land not covered with ice or snow  west-northwest of Mount Alibi on the north side of Leppard Glacier, in Voden Heights on Oscar II Coast in Graham Land. Surveyed by Falkland Islands Dependencies Survey (FIDS) in 1955. Named adit (entrance) by United Kingdom Antarctic Place-Names Committee (UK-APC), because at the time (1957), it marked the approach to an unsurveyed inland area between Leppard Glacier and Flask Glacier.

References

Nunataks of Graham Land
Oscar II Coast